Mangelia orophoma is a species of sea snail, a marine gastropod mollusk in the family Mangeliidae.

Description
The length of this very rare shell attains 3 mm, its diameter 1.25 mm.

(Original description) This is a minute turreted pale brown species. The shell contains six whorls, angled just below the sutures, then straight. The straight longitudinal ribs, few in number, are crossed by lirae, conspicuous and large for the size of the shell, six at the penultimate whorl, nine on the body whorl, and less in proportion (e.g. four in the antepenultimate) on the other whorls. The aperture is narrow. The sinus is large and hollowing across the outer lip; which is somewhat thickened and obscurely toothed within.

Distribution
This marine species occurs off the Loyalty Islands and off Mactan Island, Philippines

References

External links
  Tucker, J.K. 2004 Catalog of recent and fossil turrids (Mollusca: Gastropoda). Zootaxa 682:1–1295.
 

orophoma
Gastropods described in 1896